Tom Roberts is an Ohio Democratic politician who formerly served as a member of the Ohio General Assembly.

Career

Ohio House of Representatives
When Ed Orlett resigned from the Ohio House of Representatives in 1986, House Democrats appointed Roberts to serve the remainder of his term.  He went on to win election that same November, and again in 1988 and 1990.

In 1992, Roberts was challenged by his predecessor, Ed Orlett, for the Democratic nomination, however Roberts ultimately won the primary election. He went on to win reelection in 1994, and 1996 as well.

State Senate
By 1998, term limits did not allow Roberts to seek another term in 2000, and he was succeeded by his former aide, Fred Strahorn. He instead decided to run for Montgomery County Commissioner, but lost in a landslide.

Following Rhine McLin's victory to become Mayor of Dayton, Ohio in 2001, her state Senate seat became vacant.  As a result, Roberts was appointed to serve the remainder of her term, and went on to win his own full term in 2002. He won reelection in 2006 and served as assistant minority leader in the 127th General Assembly.

Ohio Civil Rights Commission
By 2009, Roberts was unable to run again for his Senate seat. As a result, Ohio Governor Ted Strickland appointed Roberts to the Ohio Civil Rights Commission.  He therefore was required to resign his Senate seat, and was replaced again by Fred Strahorn.

NAACP involvement
On Saturday, September 9, 2017, the Ohio Conference NAACP held its biennial election with terms commencing on September 9, 2017 and expiring on September 14, 2019. Tom Roberts, 2nd Vice President of the Dayton Unit of the National Association for the Advancement of Colored People NAACP, was elected to serve as President of the Ohio Conference NAACP. Roberts defeated Arlene Anderson, Secretary of the Cleveland Unit NAACP and received 68.85% of the votes.

On Saturday, September 14, 2019, the Ohio Conference NAACP held its biennial election with terms commencing on September 14, 2019 and expiring on September 11, 2021. Tom Roberts was re-elected to serve as President of the Ohio Conference NAACP. Roberts defeated Arlean Anderson, of Cleveland, Ohio and received 87.30% of the votes.

   

On Saturday, September 11, 2021, Tom Roberts was re-elected as President of the Ohio Conference NAACP. Roberts defeated Joe Mallory, President of the Cincinnati NAACP, and received 55% of the votes.

References

External links
Project Vote Smart - Senator Thomas M. 'Tom' Roberts (OH) profile
Follow the Money - Tom Roberts
2006 2004 2002 2000 1998 1996 campaign contributions

Democratic Party Ohio state senators
Democratic Party members of the Ohio House of Representatives
1952 births
Living people
University of Dayton alumni
African-American state legislators in Ohio
21st-century American politicians
21st-century African-American politicians
20th-century African-American people